Gavkadeh (also Romanized as Gāvḵadeh) is a village in Dorunak Rural District, Zeydun District, Behbahan County, Khuzestan Province, Iran. At the 2006 census, its population was 77, in 16 families.

References 

Populated places in Behbahan County